Norman Batley (aka Norman B.) is a radio personality who has hosted and programmed award-winning shows for stations in the United Kingdom, Seattle, Washington and Tampa, Florida. He is also a business entrepreneur who has created, managed and owned successful restaurant concepts in the Tampa Bay area. Norman B. continues to program, write, edit and host "Life Elsewhere", a weekly show about art, media and culture. The show is syndicated to various affiliates including WMNF. The podcast is heard on NPROne, Apple Podcasts & Mixcloud. He also produces and hosts "Life Elsewhere Music", a weekly show on music which often features conversations with noted figures in the music industry, heard on various radio and internet stations such as WNRN, NWCZ, Internet Radio Network, and Cornucopia.

Career 

Norman B.'s career has spanned the worlds of broadcasting, advertising and hospitality. After studying Graphic Design and graduating from Richmond College in London, his first position was as a graphic designer for BBC News.  He later began working as Art Director for EMI Records, working on album covers, publicity and branding campaigns for some of the top recording artists. Later he left EMI to begin his own boutique agency specializing in branding and promotion for the music and fashion industries. A client based in Seattle, Washington led to an extensive stay in America which in turn resulted in an opportunity to be a guest on a local radio show, talking about the new music coming out of the UK. His radio appearance attracted enough interest from listeners and management alike to prompt Norman to explore a regular radio time slot.

For several years, "Life Elsewhere" was a syndicated program, going out to college stations throughout the U.S.  It later became a permanent feature on station, KCMU (KCMU became KEXP-FM 90.3FM in April 2001).

"Life Elsewhere" morphed into a weekly show for the pirate station Phoenix Radio out of London.  Norman B. launched the reggae show "Positive Vibrations" for KCMU.  The show could be heard on Saturday mornings.

"'All things considered, 'Positive Vibrations' may be the best show on local radio," wrote Bart Becker of The Seattle Weekly. "The host Norman Batley is a chatty, funny, informative Britisher."

Norman B.’s first foray into commercial radio was in 1984 for top-rated album-oriented rock station KXRX, where he produced and hosted "Seattle Blues," a Sunday night show that drew a large and devoted following.  Bart Becker of The Seattle Weekly wrote that Norman B. was "stirring up the Sunday night radio waves" and "breaking the sound barrier." The ratings for "Seattle Blues" were so strong that he was lured away to host a midday talk show on KGW in Portland, Oregon, with the KXRX management flying the host back and forth between the two cities.  Prompted by the success of "Seattle Blues," KXRX unveiled a new weekly new music show hosted by Norman B. called, "The Xtra Hour."

In August 1991, at the peak of Seattle's globally renowned "grunge" music wave, Norman B. was hired away from KXRX to become drive-time personality on the newly launched alternative radio station 107.7 KNDD The End.  Within six weeks of The End's first broadcast, three albums by local artists — "Ten" by Pearl Jam, "Nevermind" by Nirvana and "Badmotorfinger" by Soundgarden — were released, reaching the top of the Billboard charts, and KNDD was riding the wave.  Within a year the new station was "defying history," as reported in the Seattle Times. "This spring's Arbitron ratings show KNDD in the top three stations among listeners aged 18–34," writes Times reporter Ken Hunt. "The station has become profitable and has become one of the most active sponsors of concerts and club nights around the area."

The Seattle Weekly wrote that "In the past six months 'The End' has become one of the hottest stations in the city... leonine Brit and gentleman rocker Norman B makes an amiable afternoon companion."

"I loved all of the DJs," recalls blogger Michael Sutton on the occasion of The End's 20th anniversary. "British iconoclast Norman B. (a favorite of mine when he was upsetting KXRX’s bell-bottom crowd with an alternative weekly show). The eclectic mix of music... was radio at its finest."

By the first part of the 1990s, grunge had made Seattle the center of the universe for popular music, The End its chief purveyor in the market, and Norman B. that station's highest-profile on-air personality. In 1993 readers of The Seattle Weekly voted Norman B. "Best Radio Voice," edging out Hall of Fame Seattle Mariners broadcaster Dave Niehaus. His "smooth British voice adds class," wrote Elizabethe Brown of the Bellevue Journal American.
 
In 1997, Norman B. left The End to work for WSJT in Tampa, Florida to anchor that station's format makeover. "The Norman B. Show," co-hosted by Maria Jannello, premiered that year with a new music-intensive, personality-driven format, and soon gained a large following.

Restaurateur 
Norman B. decided to step away from radio and pursue the restaurant business. He partnered in a French-Vietnamese bistro, which became one of the most popular establishments in the Tampa area, earning a rating by Conde Nast as one of the “Top 60 Restaurants in the World."  Shortly after the launch, the St. Petersburg Times wrote in a review that "high style comes in a tiny boite.  French and Vietnamese flavors meet with flair in stunning soups, meat salads and classic entrees.  Fresh herbs and flowers are as luxurious as the duck and lobster.  Best service of the year."

Norman B. opened three more new eateries, including The Yellow Door, described as a "paradox" by food writer Natalie Capisi of Clique in "that is as visionary as it is rooted in custom, making it an enjoyable puzzle to ponder as you show off your chopsticking skills."

"The Yellow Door, my favorite new entry in the Hyde Park dining scene," writes Sara Kennedy of CL Tampa. "The Yellow Door is Restaurant Royalty. It's a fabulously original, creative and consistent restaurant that any foodie would love.  I tried a number of dishes, and was astonished at their complexity and sheer exuberance.  I nearly dropped my fancy chopsticks in a fit of swooning."

On August 16, 2002, staff writer Michael Canning of the St. Petersburg Times reported that "one of Tampa's most consistently stylish restaurateurs... plans to open a third restaurant. Regulars know to expect stylish decor and natty wait staff. (The Yellow Door) promises a Zen motif with cool colors, natural textures, and 'a very strong emphasis on balance.' Servers may be outfitted in black T-shirts with quotes from Confucius."

"The photos hang in two long rows over the bar, creating a focal point for all who come to relax, celebrate or forget," writes Susan Thurston, Tampa Bay Times. "Each subject holds a drink – wine, beer, even milk. People ask about them constantly."

"Diners may recognize the curved walls and oversized ceiling columns," writes Michael Canning, Tampa Bay Times. "But the rest of the space has been redone in adherence to feng shui principles. Bamboo and cedar surfaces and modern track lighting hold sway in the dining room. Steel mesh curtains partition the lounge, which features a stainless steel bar and Batley's black and white portraits of staff, family and patrons. (Can you spot attorney John Fitzgibbons? Hinks and Elaine Shimberg?)"

Norman B. and 'Life Elsewhere' Return to Radio 
In February 2013, Norman B. was back on the air, relaunching "Life Elsewhere" as a weekly music, arts and culture program on Tampa Bay public radio station WMNF.

The Tampa Bay Tribune reported the premiere of "Life Elsewhere" as part of a programming overhaul at WMNF, with the independent, non-profit station "tweaking the schedule in response to what our listeners have said about what they like and don't like," according to Program Director Randy Wind.

Nonprofit 
Norman B. has been actively involved with charitable work and nonprofit organizations throughout his career. Notable events include his emcee work during "KISS THE SKY! The Orca Freedom Concert,"  a historic Earth Day 2014 benefit show at Seattle's Sky Church at EMP Museum featuring Graham Nash, Heart, Joan Jett and the Blackhearts, Country Joe McDonald, Arielle, and the Andrew Morse Band with Faces and New Faces keyboardist Ian McLagan. In all, KISS THE SKY! (a reference to Seattle's Jimi Hendrix) showcased four inductees into the Rock and Roll Hall of Fame – or five, given Nash's two HoF inductions, as a founding member of both The Hollies and Crosby, Stills and Nash. The sellout concert raised tens of thousands of dollars for wild orca research and advocacy. It also provided Norman B. the opportunity to discover that he and McLagan attended the same art school as kids in London. It would spark a unique oral history collaboration between the two musicologists that lasted until McLagan's passing in the fall of 2014.

Loyal Listeners 
Norman B. remains one of the most recognized radio personalities in the Pacific Northwest—even though he hasn't been on air in the Seattle market since the mid-1990s. In a Seattle Post-Intelligencer column, reporter Bill Virgin surveyed readers on "what local hosts or personalities do you miss that you'd like to have back on the air?"

Norman B. was near the top of that list.

"Think no one cares about an old-fashioned communications medium like radio?," writes Virgin. "Then ask people what they think about it – and see if anyone cares enough to respond. We did ask. They did respond. And it's obvious people do care about radio."

Radio Career Timeline 
1979 – 1980 – KOAS/Olympia
Weekly alternative show on campus station that gave birth to Op Magazine and K Records, and helped launch the career of the founder of Sub Pop Records and numerous musical and artistic talents.
1979 – 1982 – KRAB/Seattle
Weekly alternative show "Life Elsewhere" on free-form public station, part of the original Pacifica group.
1980 – 1981 – KXRX/Seattle
Commercial rock station; introduced "Seattle Blues," an early version of what would later become an award-winning and long-running brand.
1980 – 1989 – KCMU/Seattle (now KEXP-FM)
Leading non-profit station now owned by Microsoft’s Paul Allen; hosted "Positive Vibrations," a weekly reggae show with the highest-rated Arbitron 12+ numbers for the time slot; hosted "Life Elsewhere," a highly rated pre-recorded weekly alternative show, distributed and heard on over 25 college stations.
1981 –1983 – Phoenix Radio/London
Weekly overview of alternative American music on a pirate station in the UK that went on to achieve commercial success.
1984 – 1991 – KXRX/Seattle
Regular air-shift on this leading commercial station; winner of “Best Radio Voice” award.
Hosted and programmed the weekly program, "Seattle Blues," the longest-running and highest-rated “specialty show” in Seattle radio history.
1988 – 1991 – KGW/Portland
Radio personality for the midday show on a new talk station in Oregon.
1991 – 1997 – KNDD/Seattle
Afternoon drive-time Launch Host for a new commercial alternative station at the height of Seattle "grunge" music phenomena, elevating the station as a national leader in commercial alternative radio. Included interviews with all the latest talent, celebrities and newsmakers. Arbitron rated KNDD the leading 12+ station in the country.
1997 – 1999 – WSJT/Tampa
Launch Host of "The Norman B. Show," a magazine-style morning show for adult music station, with celebrity and newsmaker interviews, telephone calls, scripted sketches, and characters.
1999–Present Creator and Producer of "Life Elsewhere," a music and lifestyle blogsite.
2013–Present Creator, host & producer of "Life Elsewhere" Radio show and Podcast about Art, Media, and Culture. Interviews with a wide variety of guests, including, authors, musicians, and news pundits. Heard on WMNF/Tampa and other stations and podcast platforms including NPR One and Apple Podcasts Creator, Host, and Producer of "Life Elsewhere Music," weekly music, arts, focussing on new, rare, unusual music, plus in-depth interviews with musicians

References

External links
Life Elsewhere (Official website)
Excerpts of celebrity interviews conducted by Norman B., including David Bowie, Sheryl Crow, Tori Amos and Sir Mix-a-Lot.
On-Camera Work

American radio personalities
Living people
Year of birth missing (living people)